Nand Ram Saini was appointed as Zaildar during the British Raj rule of India. He inherited the Zaildari in 1906 when his father died. He was appointed Zaildar from Hissar division, Punjab region.

Early life and career
Saini was born in the present-day Hisar of Haryana, India to Chaudhari Mohan Lal of Hissar.

Indian Independence Movement
He gave up the Zalidari in 1921 in order to support the Indian independence movement. Later, he became a member of the Indian National Congress and was also head of Hindu Mahasabha for Hissar briefly before rejoining Congress again in 1959. He died in 1973 at the age of 90.

See also 
 Sardar Nanu Singh Saini - Sikh army general and a well-known jagirdar in Phulkian riyasat

References

People from Punjab, India
1973 deaths
Year of birth missing